Sajith Dissanayaka (born 24 July 1989) is a Sri Lankan cricketer. He made his List A debut for Ratnapura District in the 2016–17 Districts One Day Tournament on 22 March 2017. He made his Twenty20 debut for Lankan Cricket Club in the 2017–18 SLC Twenty20 Tournament on 25 February 2018.

References

External links
 

1989 births
Living people
Sri Lankan cricketers
Lankan Cricket Club cricketers
Ratnapura District cricketers